Fritz is an unincorporated community within Magoffin County, Kentucky, United States.

A post office first opened in the community in 1912, and it has been known historically as Jondun and Nola. The name was changed to Fritz in 1916 in honor of Fritz Arnett, a resident who had filed the first application for the post office.

References

Unincorporated communities in Magoffin County, Kentucky
Unincorporated communities in Kentucky